Dr. Chapman may refer to:

 Dr. Allan Chapman (born 1946), British historian
 Dr. Philip K. Chapman (1935–2021), Australian-born American astronaut
 Dr. Steve Chapman (born 1959), British university principal